Egged Bus 99 was a bus route that was operated for tourists in Jerusalem. The bus had 29 stops It was a hop on/hop off double-decker bus that reached 35 of the leading tourist attractions in Jerusalem, provided audio commentary in eight languages.

In 2015, Egged sold the bus route with its double decker buses to Yara Tours. During the operation of the route by Yara Tours, the route was operated by request only. In 2016, Yara Tours completely stopped to operate the route and the newest bus from the fleet of the route was sold while the older buses went out of service.

Stops
The Egged 99 Bus stopped at:

See also
Tourism in Israel
List of Egged bus routes in Israel

References

Bus routes
Tourism in Jerusalem
Transport in Jerusalem